Caroline Ann O'Connor  (born 2 September 1962) is a Helpmann Award-winning, Olivier Award-nominated Anglo-Australian singer, dancer and actress (theatre, film, TV). For her theatre work she has won three Helpmann Awards: Best Female Actor in a Play for Edith Piaf in Piaf in 2001 and the same category for Judy Garland in End of the Rainbow in 2006, and Best Female Actor in a Musical for Reno Sweeney in Anything Goes in 2015.

Early life 

O'Connor was born in Oldham, Lancashire, England, to Irish parents. After her family migrated to Australia she was brought up and educated in Sydney. She took Irish dance lessons, with Joy Ransley and Valerie McGrath. She joined a touring dance troupe by August 1974, which travelled to Ireland, Paris, London and the United States west coast. The troupe's members, including O'Connor, competed in the Irish Dancing World Championships held in Dublin. At the age of 15 she returned to Dublin to appear in a dance competition and finished third.

O'Connor later recalled, "When I was growing up in Rockdale as a little girl of Irish parents singing show tunes I didn't really fit in. Everyone was in their denim shorts and thongs and wanting to go down to Cronulla and I wanted to stay home and listen to Doris Day." At 17, she returned to London and trained as a dancer at the Royal Ballet School. She worked for one year at the Australian Opera Ballet. She became an Australian citizen in 2007.

Career 

O'Connor made her musical theatre debut in an Australian tour of Oklahoma! in 1982, she later reminisced, "I was about 20 and I got into the show [and] I thought, 'This is where I'm meant to be.' I feel so fortunate." In the following May she took the role of Consuelo in West Side Story at Sydney's Her Majesty's Theatre. Subsequently, O'Connor worked both in Australia and the United Kingdom.

Upon return to London she was a member of the ensemble cast of Me and My Girl at the Leicester Haymarket Theatre in 1984 and then at the Adelphi Theatre. Other British theatre credits include, A Chorus Line, Cabaret, Hot Stuff, Chicago, Damn Yankees, West Side Story and as Ellie May in Show Boat for the Royal Shakespeare Company and Opera North in 1989. She understudied, and went on to perform, the role of Angel in the 1988 London production of The Rink by Kander and Ebb. She appeared in the UK premiere of the musical, Baby. Several of her successful early lead roles in the UK were in the town of Oldham, where she was born.

The entertainer returned to Australia by February 1994, where she took the role of Anita in a national tour of West Side Story, performing in Melbourne, Adelaide and Sydney and then Auckland in New Zealand. She won a Green Room Award. Back in London, her West End theatre performances included Mabel in Mack and Mabel for which she received an Olivier nomination for Best Actress in a Musical in 1996.

In 1998 O'Connor was back in Australia as Velma Kelly in Chicago for which she won a Green Room Award and the Mo Award for Female Musical Theatre Performer of the Year. She followed with roles in Man of La Mancha, Oklahoma! and concert productions of Funny Girl and Mack & Mabel. Her portrayal of Édith Piaf in Pam Gems's play Piaf in 2000 gained her three Australian theatre awards.

O'Connor's musical film work includes the role of Nini Legs in the Air in Baz Luhrmann's Moulin Rouge! (2001), and Ethel Merman in the Cole Porter biopic De-Lovely (2004). She featured on the De-Lovely soundtrack, singing "Anything Goes". In 2003 she made her Broadway debut as Velma Kelly in Chicago. Thereafter she performed in Australia, UK and United States.

The one-woman play, Bombshells (2004), was written especially for O'Connor by playwright, Joanna Murray-Smith. The original production was filmed for a broadcast by ABC Television. Bombshells toured to the Edinburgh Festival (where she won the Fringe First Award), London's West End at the Arts Theatre (for which she received a second Laurence Olivier Award nomination), and at the World Stage Festival in Toronto, Ontario.

O'Connor starred as Judy Garland in the 2005 world premiere of Peter Quilter's play, End of the Rainbow, at the Sydney Opera House. Following its Sydney and Melbourne seasons, she recorded a tribute album, A Tribute to Judy Garland, and reprised her Helpmann Award winning role in Sydney at the Theatre Royal in 2006.

She starred in the premiere production of the musical The Hatpin, which opened in Sydney on 27 February 2008. In June of that year she played the title role, specifically written for her, in the premiere of David Williamson's play, Scarlett O'Hara at the Crimson Parrot, at the Melbourne Theatre Company.

In March 2009 O'Connor reprised her role as Kelly in the 2009 Australian production of Chicago where she starred alongside Craig McLachlan and Gina Riley. In May 2010 she appeared as Mrs Cooper in the TV series, Lowdown. Also in that year she performed at the BBC Proms celebration of Stephen Sondheim's 80th birthday at the Royal Albert Hall. In May 2011 she starred as Mrs Lovett in the Théâtre du Châtelet production of Sondheim's Sweeney Todd: The Demon Barber of Fleet Street in Paris, with David Charles Abell as musical director. Sondheim has said that O'Connor was "the best Mrs Lovett I have ever heard."

In 2012 O'Connor originated the role of Miss Shields in a limited run of A Christmas Story: The Musical. It ran for 51 performances in late 2012, and received a nomination for the 2013 Best Musical Tony Award, for its track "You'll Shoot Your Eye Out", featuring O'Connor, which was broadcast live on CBS during the 67th Tony Awards show on 9 June 2013.

As a recording artist O'Connor has released four solo CDs, What I Did for Love (1998), A Tribute to Piaf (2001), From Stage to Screen (2001) and A Tribute to Garland (2005). She has contributed to numerous cast recordings and compilations.

From April 2017 through to March 2018 O'Connor played Countess Lily in the musical, Anastasia, at the Broadhurst Theatre on Broadway, New York. From May to June 2018 she starred in a London production of The Rink and in mid-August she portrayed Garland in The Production Company's The Boy from Oz in Melbourne.

O’Connor began 2019 by starting in the critically acclaimed and sold out Darlinghurst theatre Co. production of 'The Rise and Fall of Little Voice' (directed by Shaun Rennie). She followed this with a staged concert of the rarely performed musical Applause, playing the leading role of Margo Channing.

Personal life 

As from April 2008, Caroline O'Connor was married to Barrie Shaw, a musician. By May 2017, they had celebrated their 21st anniversary. She has homes in Surrey and in Sydney.

Performances

Stage

Discography

Albums

Awards 
In 2020, O'Connor became a Member of the Order of Australia (AM) for significant service to the performing arts, particularly to musical theatre.

Green Room Award
1994 Green Room Award for Female Artist in a Featured Role (Music Theatre) − West Side Story
1998 Green Room Award for Female Artist in a Leading Role (Music Theatre) − Chicago
2000 Green Room Award for Female Artist in a Leading Role (Music Theatre) − Piaf

Helpmann Awards
The Helpmann Awards is an awards show, celebrating live entertainment and performing arts in Australia, presented by industry group Live Performance Australia since 2001. Note: 2020 and 2021 were cancelled due to the COVID-19 pandemic.
 

! 
|-
| 2001
| Caroline O'Connor - Piaf
| Helpmann Award for Best Female Actor in a Play
| 
|
|-
| 2002
| Caroline O'Connor - Bombshell
| Best Female Actor in a Play
| 
|
|-
| 2003
| Caroline O'Connor - Man of La Mancha
| Helpmann Award for Best Female Actor in a Musical
| 
|
|-
| 2006
| Caroline O'Connor - End of the Rainbow
| Best Female Actor in a Musical
| 
|
|-
| 2014
| Caroline O'Connor - Gypsy: A Musical Fable
| Best Female Actor in a Musical
| 
|
|-
| 2015
| Caroline O'Connor - 'Anything Goes''
| Best Female Actor in a Musical
| 
|
|-

Mo Awards
The Australian Entertainment Mo Awards (commonly known informally as the Mo Awards), were annual Australian entertainment industry awards. They recognise achievements in live entertainment in Australia from 1975 to 2016. Caroline O'Connor won five awards in that time.
 (wins only)
|-
| 1994
| Caroline O'Connor
| Supporting Musical Theatrical Performer of the Year 
| 
|-
| 1996
| Caroline O'Connor
| Supporting Musical Theatrical Performer of the Year 
| 
|-
| 1998
| Caroline O'Connor
| Female Musical Theatre Performer of the Year  
| 
|-
| 1999
| Caroline O'Connor
| Female Musical Theatre Performer of the Year  
| 
|-
| 2000
| Caroline O'Connor
| Female Musical Theatre Performer of the Year  
| 
|-

References

General
Caroline O'Connor Returns as Star of ENO's On the Town (BroadwayWorld)
Cinema.com
Allegro Music
Notes

External links
Caroline O'Connor's Official Website

Movies, Yahoo

1962 births
Australian stage actresses
Australian film actresses
Australian television actresses
Australian women singers
Australian female dancers
Australian people of Irish descent
English emigrants to Australia
Helpmann Award winners
Living people
Actresses from Oldham
People educated at the Royal Ballet School
Naturalised citizens of Australia
Members of the Order of Australia
20th-century Australian actresses
21st-century Australian actresses
Actresses from Sydney